Ernie Stewart may refer to:

 Earnie Stewart (born 1969), American soccer player
 Ernie Stewart (Australian footballer) (1874–1946), Australian rules footballer
 Ernie Stewart (umpire) (1909–2001), American baseball umpire